Helmuth Naudé (30 November 1904 – 3 February 1943) was a German modern pentathlete. He competed at the 1932 Summer Olympics. He was an Obert with the German Army and killed in action during World War II.

References

1904 births
1943 deaths
German male modern pentathletes
Olympic modern pentathletes of Germany
Modern pentathletes at the 1932 Summer Olympics
Sportspeople from Gdańsk
People from West Prussia
German Army personnel killed in World War II
German Army officers of World War II